The ileojejunal bypass is an experimental surgery designed as a remedy for morbid obesity. 

It was first performed on a series of patients at White Memorial Hospital, Los Angeles, California, in the mid- to late-1970s.

References

General surgery